The Chilean Antarctic Institute (in Spanish Instituto Antártico Chileno) is a public service institution in charge of managing and coordinating scientific activities in the Chilean Antarctic Territory. It is the national Antarctic operator and has an active role in Antarctic affairs.

External links
 

Chilean Antarctic Territory
Research institutes in Chile
Chile
Chile and the Antarctic